Papa João Paulo II is the Portuguese name for Pope John Paul II.

João Paulo II may also refer to:

 João Paulo II Airport (IATA airport code: PPL; ICAO airport code: LPPD), Sao Miguel, Azores
 Estádio Papa João Paulo II, São Paulo, Brazil; a stadium

See also
John Paul II (disambiguation)
João Paulo (disambiguation)
João II
João
Paulo